Shital Morjaria is an Indian journalist and film-maker. Her debut full-length film All I Want Is Everything was released in 2013. Before that she made a few documentary films. She is also the executive producer of TV9. In 2008, she received The Ramnath Goenka Excellence in Journalism award for her show Naveena.

Career 
Morjaria started her career as a news presenter of a television show named News Wave. For the next 15 years she worked in other fields of print and visual media. Morjaria was awarded the Ramnath Goenka Award, the highest award in India for journalism, for her program Naveena. The show focused on issues faced by Indian women. In 2013, she made her directorial debut in big screen with the film All I Want Is Everything.

Works

Films

Other works 
 News Wave (on DD Metro II, as a news reporter)
 Naveena

Awards 
 The Ramnath Goenka Excellence in Journalism (2007)

References

External links 
 

Living people
Indian women television journalists
Indian television journalists
21st-century Indian film directors
Indian women film directors
Year of birth missing (living people)